Isaac Cissé (born 3 February 1994) is an Ivorian footballer who plays for Felgueiras 1932.

Career

Leça
In January 2020, Cissé returned to Leça, the club he played for in the 2018-19 season. Cissé scored two goals in his comeback game against C.D. Trofense.

References

External links
 
 

1994 births
Living people
Footballers from Abidjan
Ivorian footballers
Ivorian expatriate footballers
Association football forwards
Vitória S.C. B players
Vitória S.C. players
Union Titus Pétange players
C.D. Cinfães players
Leça F.C. players
S.C. Beira-Mar players
F.C. Felgueiras 1932 players
Primeira Liga players
Liga Portugal 2 players
Luxembourg National Division players
Campeonato de Portugal (league) players
Ivorian expatriate sportspeople in Portugal
Ivorian expatriate sportspeople in Luxembourg
Expatriate footballers in Portugal
Expatriate footballers in Luxembourg